Daniela Maria Voets de Sousa Campos (born 31 March 2002) is a Portuguese professional racing cyclist, who currently rides for UCI Women's Continental Team . 

At the European Junior Track championships in 2020 she won a bronze medal in the Omnium. She rode in the 2021 World championships and was the only Portuguese women to finish. In 2022 she won the Portuguese National Time Trial Championships for a second time.

Major results
Source:
2019
 1st  Road race, National Junior Road Championships
2020
 European Junior Road Championships
5th Road race
9th Time trial
2021
 National Road Championships
1st  Time trial
2nd Road race
2022
 National Road Championships
 1st  Road race
 1st  Time trial
 2nd  Road race, Mediterranean Games

References

External links
 

2002 births
Living people
Portuguese female cyclists
21st-century Portuguese women
Mediterranean Games silver medalists for Portugal
Competitors at the 2022 Mediterranean Games